Sadat-e Bakhat Najat (also Romanized as Sādāt-e Bakhāt Najāt) is a village in Ahudasht Rural District, Shavur District, Shush County, Khuzestan Province, Iran. At the 2006 census, its population was 95, in 10 families.

References 

Populated places in Shush County